Malbuisson is a commune in the Doubs department in the Bourgogne-Franche-Comté region in eastern France.

Overview
On a terrace above Lake Saint-Point, between water and forest, the village of Malbuisson stretches for two kilometers between Vézenay, a formerly separate village, and the forest of "La Fuvelle". At the beginning of the 20th century, Malbuisson saw a significant expansion with the development of tourism, made possible by the construction of a railway line named the "Tacot" between Pontarlier and Foncine. Then classified "station climatérique" (alt. 900 m), Malbuisson became a pleasant destination for the rich people of Pontarlier and Besançon, but also for Parisians. Since then, the economy of the village has developed mainly around tourism and continues by offering: 
 Nordic skiing, Mountain bike trails, hiking or snow shoe excursions in the surrounding mountains
 boating, pedal boats, fishing and swimming in the lake
 hotel establishments and restaurants, and shops offering local products 
 nature reserves

Geography

Population

Tourism
Malbuisson is a village typical of the “Franche-Comté” region, located on the edge of the Saint-Point lake, at an altitude of 850m to 1000m, close to the landmark of the area: Le Mont D’or at 1463m.

Economy
In addition to tourism, Malbuisson has one of the last cheese factories to produce Comté cheese in the traditional fashion in big copper cauldrons.

See also
 Communes of the Doubs department

References

External links

 Malbuisson on the intercommunal Web site of the department 
 www.malbuisson.fr - Official website of Malbuisson

Communes of Doubs